The 5th Central American and Caribbean Junior Championships was held in Bridgetown, Barbados, on 23–25 July 1982.

Medal summary
Medal winners are published by category: Junior A, Male, Junior A, Female, and Junior B. 
Complete results can be found on the World Junior Athletics History website.

Male Junior A (under 20)

Female Junior A (under 20)

Male Junior B (under 17)

Female Junior B (under 17)

Medal table (unofficial)

Participation (unofficial)

The British Virgin Islands, Colombia, Grenada, Martinique, and Saint Vincent and the Grenadines competed for the first time at the championships. Detailed result lists can be found on the World Junior Athletics History website.  An unofficial count yields the number of about 320 athletes (186 junior (under-20) and 134 youth (under-17)) from about 18 countries, again a new record number of participating nations:

 (3)
 (19)
 (61)
 (4)
 (1)
 (5)
 (16)
 (1)
 (8)
 (1)
 (34)
 (2)
 México(25)
 (7)
 (56)
 (4)
 (26)
 (47)

References

External links
Official CACAC Website
World Junior Athletics History

Central American and Caribbean Junior Championships in Athletics
1982 in Barbados
Central American and Caribbean Junior Championships
International athletics competitions hosted by Barbados
1982 in youth sport